The Schumacher Fusion is an on-road 1:10 scale nitro-powered radio-controlled car made by Schumacher Racing Products. It is the fastest ready-to-run 1:10 on-road car created as of 2008, featuring a 0.28 in³ (4.6 cm³) engine capable of producing 2.85 horsepower (2.12 kW) at 33,000 rpm. It is four-wheel drive with a three-speed gearbox, making it capable of speeds in excess of 80 mph (130 km/h) and 0-60 mph (0–100 km/h) times in less than two seconds.

The "E-start" system is used to start the engine, this means the starter is operated using a portable electric drill. The gearbox is not natively adjustable, the only way of adjusting it is to open it and change the springs themselves.
The Fusion will reach around 80 mph (130 km/h) with standard gearing, there is also a low-speed gear-set available for even faster acceleration to use on smaller tracks.

Specifications

 Type: 1:10 on-road, nitro.
 Engine: 0.28 in³ (4.6 cm³) Picco, 7 port fully race tuned.
 Gearbox: Three gears (fixed).
 Brakes: One carbon fibre brake disc.
 Chassis: 3.0 mm (CNC machined)
 Weight: 1850 g (dry).
 Adjustable settings include: Ride height, springs, dampers, toe, camber and caster.
 Fuel-tank: 75 cc

Performance

 0-60 MPH: Estimated under 2 seconds with ideal configuration and conditions.
 Top speed: Estimated 80 MPH with high speed gearing.

External links
 Schumacher - official site
 RCU review - RC Universe review

Schumacher Racing Products